They Bought a Boat is a 1914 American silent comedy film featuring Oliver Hardy.

Plot

Cast
 Royal Byron as Captain Jack Burns (as Roy Byron)
 C.W. Ritchie as Captain Billy Hale
 Ed Lawrence as Government Inspector
 James Levering as Ancient Mariner
 Billy Bowers as Jack Kedge
 Oliver Hardy as Cabin Boy (as Babe Hardy)

See also
 List of American films of 1914
 Oliver Hardy filmography

External links
 

1914 films
American silent short films
American black-and-white films
1914 comedy films
1914 short films
Films directed by Arthur Hotaling
Silent American comedy films
American comedy short films
1910s American films